Sharnee Zoll-Norman (born July 11, 1986) is an American former professional basketball player. Zoll-Norman played throughout Europe and most recently with the Chicago Sky of the WNBA.

Personal
Zoll was born in Philadelphia, Pennsylvania to Cheryl and Tony Zoll. She is the only child of Cheryl and shares her father with brother Chris and Dustin Myers. Cheryl is a retired veteran of the Armed Forces. She lived on McGuire Air Force Base for the majority of her life and also resided in Sembach, Germany while her mother was stationed there. Zoll moved to Marlboro Township, New Jersey before her freshman year to attend Marlboro High School, a school her mother chose for the quality of both its academics and basketball. She attended Marlboro for her first three high school years before transferring to Highland Regional High School in the Blackwood section of Gloucester Township, New Jersey for her senior year. Although she has mentioned her wife  Serita Norman in previous interviews, she never formally came out until a June 2013 interview with the Windy City Times, stating "If I was straight, I wouldn't have to come out and say that I was straight. So I've never had an official coming-out, or something where I felt I had to announce that I was gay. But everyone knows. I wear my wedding ring proudly; I have matching tattoos with my wife, and also have her name tattooed on me. We go a lot of places [together] and I surely don't hide it [that she's my wife]."

College career
Zoll played at the University of Virginia from 2004 to 2008, where she was a 1000-point scorer and two-time All-ACC third team honoree.  She is most widely known for holding the Atlantic Coast Conference assist record with 785 assists; previously held by Dawn Staley, also a UVA alum.  Sharnee is the only woman in ACC history to post three seasons of at least 200 assists and did so in succession from 2006 to 2008.  In the summer of 2005, Zoll was named to the gold medal-winning USA U19 World Championship Team.

Virginia  statistics
Source

USA Basketball
Zoll joined the USA Women's U18 team as it became the U19 team, and competed in the 2005 U19 World Championships in Tunis, Tunisia. The USA team won all eight games, winning the gold medal. Zoll averaged 2.9 points per game.

Professional career
Sharnee was drafted 29th overall in the 2008 WNBA Draft to the Los Angeles Sparks.  After being waived by the Sparks, she spent a short time with the Minnesota Lynx before continuing her playing career overseas.  In the 2008–2009 season, she signed with a Romanian club named Sepsi B.C..  Zoll led the Romanian league and EuroCup in assists.  In the following season, Zoll signed with Botas Spor in Adana, Turkey.  Again she led the Turkish league and EuroCup in assists.  Till 2013 Zoll was playing with CCC Polkowice in Poland.  She led the league in assists and assist-to-turnover ratio while leading CCC to its highest ever finish in the PLKK playoffs (2nd place).  In 2011–12, Zoll's CCC Polkowice team participated in EuroLeague Women.  She led the competition in assists per game at 6.6 while playing alongside current Spark Jantel Lavender. In 2012–13, Zoll's CCC Polkowice team won PLKK Champions title and Polish Cup as well. In the 2013–2014 season, she signed with a Polish club named KSSSE AZS PWSZ Gorzów Wielkopolski.

Zoll-Norman was hired as an assistant coach for the University of Rhode Island women's basketball team in 2019.

WNBA career statistics

Regular season

|-
| align="left" | 2008
| align="left" | Minnesota
| 6 || 0 || 5.0 || .250 || .333 || .833 || 0.5 || 0.5 || 0.2 || 0.0 || 0.5 || 1.7
|-
| align="left" | 2013
| align="left" | Chicago
| 19 || 0 || 9.7 || .214 || .000 || .625 || 0.7 || 1.7 || 0.2 || 0.0 || 0.8 || 0.9
|-
| align="left" | Career
| align="left" | 2 years, 2 teams
| 25 || 0 || 8.6 || .222 || .111 || .714 || 0.7 || 1.4 || 0.2 || 0.0 || 0.8 || 1.1

References

External links
http://www.wnba.com/draft2008/zoll_080406.html
https://web.archive.org/web/20130520034946/http://plkk.pl/zawodniczki/p/29807/sharnee_zoll.html

1986 births
Living people
African-American basketball players
American women's basketball players
Basketball players from New Jersey
Basketball players from Philadelphia
Chicago Sky players
Lesbian sportswomen
LGBT basketball players
LGBT people from Pennsylvania
American LGBT sportspeople
Los Angeles Sparks draft picks
Marlboro High School alumni
Minnesota Lynx players
Point guards
People from Gloucester Township, New Jersey
People from Marlboro Township, New Jersey
Sportspeople from Camden County, New Jersey
Sportspeople from Monmouth County, New Jersey
21st-century African-American sportspeople
21st-century African-American women
20th-century African-American people
20th-century African-American women